Colombia has won a total of 8 medals at the World Athletics Championships. Race walker Luis Fernando López won the country's first medal at the championships, a bronze that eventually turned into gold due to the disqualification for doping of the athletes who ranked first and second at the men's 20 kilometres walk event at the 2011 Championships in Daegu, South Korea. Caterine Ibargüen is the most successful Colombian athlete at the championships, with 5 medals in total.

History 
Before the medals won in 2011, sprinter Ximena Restrepo had the most outstanding presentation made by a Colombian athlete at the World Championships. She ranked sixth at the women's 400m event at the 1991 edition in Tokio. Also, Luis Fernando López ranked fourth at the men's 20 km walk event during the Berlin 2009 Championships.

Medal Count

List of Medalists

References 

History of sport in Colombia